= Cheidae =

Scientific classification
- Domain: Eukaryota
- Kingdom: Animalia
- Phylum: Arthropoda
- Class: Malacostraca
- Order: Amphipoda
- Superfamily: Haustorioidea
- Family: Cheidae

Family of crustaceans

Cheidae is a family of crustaceans belonging to the order Amphipoda.

Genera:

- Cheus Thurston, 1982
- Microcheus Souza-Fihlo, 2011
- Ruffosius Souza-Fihlo, 2011
